Leonardo Farah Shahin (born 10 August 2003) is a Swedish footballer who plays as a forward for Qviding FIF on loan from Häcken.

Club career
On 14 February 2022, Shahin was loaned to Qviding FIF.

Career statistics

Club

Notes

References

2003 births
Living people
Swedish footballers
Association football forwards
Sweden youth international footballers
Allsvenskan players
Superettan players
Ettan Fotboll players
BK Häcken players
AFC Eskilstuna players
Qviding FIF players